The Advanced Facer Canceller System (AFCS) is an electro-mechanical mail handling system.  A high-speed machine used by the US Postal Service to cull, face, and cancel letter mail through a series of automated operations. AFCS was first implemented in 1992, and is capable of processing 30,000 pieces of mail per hour.

References 
 Letter sortere get faster, smarter
 Advanced Facer Canceler System 200 
 United States Postal Service 

Mail sorting
Postal history
Postal systems
United States Postal Service